Frank King was an Irish Labour Party politician who briefly served as a member of the 13th Seanad. He was nominated by the Taoiseach Liam Cosgrave, on 22 June 1977, to fill a vacancy caused by the election of Patrick Kerrigan to Dáil Éireann at the 1977 general election. He did not contest the 1977 Seanad election.

He was an unsuccessful Labour Party candidate for the Waterford constituency at the 1977 general election.

References

Year of birth missing
Year of death missing
Labour Party (Ireland) senators
Members of the 13th Seanad
Politicians from County Waterford
Nominated members of Seanad Éireann